Auchlochan Platform railway station served Auchlochan, a village in the county of South Lanarkshire, Scotland. It was served by local trains on the Coalburn Branch south of Glasgow.

History

Opened by the Caledonian Railway it became part of the London Midland and Scottish Railway during the Grouping of 1923. Passing on to the Scottish Region of British Railways during the nationalisation of 1948. It was then closed by the British Railways Board.

The site today

The platform has been removed but the alignment of the line and a level crossing gate show its location.

See also 
 Auchlochan Collieries

References

 
 
 Site of station on navigable O.S. map On line near colliery at centre of map

Disused railway stations in South Lanarkshire
Railway stations in Great Britain opened in 1907
Railway stations in Great Britain closed in 1965
Former Caledonian Railway stations